Broderstorf station is a railway station in the municipality of Broderstorf, located in the Rostock district in Mecklenburg-Vorpommern, Germany.

References

Railway stations in Mecklenburg-Western Pomerania
Buildings and structures in Rostock (district)